Beurre monté refers to melted butter that remains emulsified, even at temperatures higher than that at which butter usually breaks down. Beurre monté may refer either to the melted butter sauce itself, or to the method of making it.

Butter is an emulsion of about 2% milk solids, 80% milk fats (clarified butter), and about 18% water. It can then be used in many ways, including as a sauce, as an ingredient for other sauces, as a poaching medium, or as a resting medium for cooked meat.

To make a beurre monté, boil a very small quantity of water, i.e. 15–60 ml (1–4 tablespoons). Once water has come to a boil, turn the heat down and start whisking the cold butter into the water, one or two chunks at a time. Add more butter whenever the chunks have melted. Once the emulsion is started, more butter can be added at a time. Continue adding butter while whisking until one has the desired quantity of beurre monté. The beurre monté must then be held warm, but under  or else it will break.

See also

 List of sauces
 Beurre noisette

External links

 Beurre Monté: The Workhorse Sauce from The French Laundry Cookbook
 Lobster Glossary definition of beurre monté

White sauces
French sauces
Butter